Joseph Sutton Beswick (1831 – 3 June 1888) was a 19th-century Member of Parliament and a magistrate in Canterbury, New Zealand.

Beswick represented the Mandeville electorate in the Canterbury Provincial Council for many years. He was first elected in April 1862 to the fourth council and held representation until April 1867. He was next a representative from June 1870 to February 1874. He was a member of the Canterbury Executive Council from 14 December 1866 to 20 April 1867, and again from 30 September 1871 to 2 January 1874.

He had been a magistrate in Lyttelton and Timaru. He died in Timaru after a long illness.

His son Harry Beswick was Mayor of Christchurch in 1896.

References

1831 births
1888 deaths
New Zealand MPs for South Island electorates
Members of the New Zealand House of Representatives
Members of Canterbury provincial executive councils
19th-century New Zealand politicians
Members of the Canterbury Provincial Council